Broaden Your Mind (1968–1969) is a British television comedy series, broadcast on BBC2 and starring Tim Brooke-Taylor and Graeme Garden, joined by Bill Oddie for the second series. Guest cast members included Michael Palin, Terry Jones, Jo Kendall, Roland MacLeod and Nicholas McArdle. It was one of BBC2's earliest programmes to be completely broadcast in colour, which had been introduced by the channel a year earlier.

Directed by Jim Franklin, the series was a precursor to the television comedy series The Goodies (of which early titles under consideration included "Narrow Your Mind").

Writers for the series included Tim Brooke-Taylor, Graeme Garden, Bill Oddie, Michael Palin, Terry Jones, John Cleese, Graham Chapman, Eric Idle, Terry Gilliam, Roland MacLeod, Marty Feldman, Barry Cryer, Barry Took, Jim Franklin, Simon Brett and Chris Stuart-Clark.

Broaden Your Mind was subtitled 'an encyclopaedia of the air' and consisted largely of short sketches. All of the programmes were wiped by the BBC after their first broadcast in 1968, and only a handful of brief filmed sequences survive, including the Peelers sketch, Turgonitis, and "Ordinary Royal Family". These are all from the fifth episode of the second series, and were included, digitally restored, on Network DVD's 2003 release The Goodies at Last. All of the programmes, however, survive as off-air audio recordings made by a fan at the time of original transmission.

Main cast
 Tim Brooke-Taylor - Various Characters
 Graeme Garden - Various Characters
 Jo Kendall - Various Characters 
 Nicholas McArdle - Various Characters 
 Bill Oddie - Various Characters 
 Roland MacLeod - Various Characters 
 Sue Williams - Various Characters 
 Gillian Parsons - Various Characters 
 Jan Gummer - Various and 
 Terry Jones - Various Characters 
 Michael Palin - Various Characters 
 Colin Bean - Various Characters

References

External links
 Comedy Guide
 
Broaden Your Mind at Comedy Zone

BBC television comedy
BBC television sketch shows
Lost BBC episodes
1960s British television sketch shows
1968 British television series debuts
1969 British television series endings